The Wonderful Adventures of Nils (literally Nils Holgersson's wonderful journey across Sweden) is a work of fiction by the Swedish writer Selma Lagerlöf, the first woman to receive the Nobel Prize in literature. It was originally published in two books, 1906 and 1907, and was first published in English as The Wonderful Adventures of Nils (1907) and The Further Adventures of Nils (1911). The two parts are later usually published together, in English as The Wonderful Adventures of Nils, but that name may also refer to the first part alone.

Like many leading Swedish intellectuals of her time, Selma Lagerlöf was an advocate of Swedish spelling reform. When first published, this book was also one of the first to adopt the new spelling mandated by a government resolution on April 7, 1906 (see Svenska Akademiens Ordlista).

Origin 

The background for publication was a commission from the National Teachers Association in 1902 to write a geography reader for the public schools. "She devoted three years to Nature study and to familiarizing herself with animal and bird life. She has sought out hitherto unpublished folklore and legends of the different provinces. These she has ingeniously woven into her story." (From translator Velma Swanston Howard's introduction.)

Plot introduction

The book is about a young lad, Nils Holgersson, whose "chief delight was to eat and sleep, and after that he liked best to make mischief". He takes great delight in hurting the animals in his family farm. Nils captures a tomte in a net while his family are at church and have left him home to memorize chapters from the Bible. The tomte proposes to Nils that if Nils frees him, the tomte will give him a huge gold coin. Nils rejects the offer and the tomte turns Nils into a tomte, which leaves him shrunken and able to talk with animals, who are thrilled to see the boy reduced to their size and are angry and hungry for revenge. While this is happening, wild geese are flying over the farm on one of their migrations, and Martin, the farm's white goose attempts to join the wild ones. In an attempt to salvage something before his family returns, Nils holds on to Martin's neck as he successfully takes off and joins the wild birds.

The wild geese, who are not pleased at all to be joined by a boy and a domestic goose, eventually take them on an adventurous trip across all the historical provinces of Sweden observing in passing their natural characteristics and economic resources. At the same time the characters and situations he encounters make him a man: the domestic goose needs to prove his ability to fly like the experienced wild geese, and Nils needs to prove to the geese that he would be a useful companion, despite their initial misgivings. During the trip, Nils learns that if he proves he has changed for the better, the tomte might be disposed to change him back to his normal size.

The book also includes various subplots, concerning people and animals whose lives are touched in one way or another by Nils and the wild geese. For example, one chapter centers on a provincial man who feels lonely and alienated in the capital Stockholm, is befriended by a nice old gentleman who tells him (and the reader) about the city's history - and only later finds that it was none other than the King of Sweden, walking incognito in the park.

The book was criticized for the fact that the goose and boy don't make any stop in the province Halland. In chapter 53 they fly over Halland on the way back to Scania, but they aren't impressed by the sight and they don't stop. However, such a chapter has been added to some translations of the book. In depictions Nils is usually wearing a red cap, although this is erroneous as he is described in the original Swedish edition as wearing a white cap.

Chapters and itinerary
This section follows the English-language translation by Velma Swanston Howard, originally published in 1907 and 1911 as The Wonderful Adventures of Nils and Further Adventures of Nils. The Howard text is that of many later publications that contain the original illustrations, new illustrations, or none at all.

The Wonderful Adventures of Nils
Howard's first volume contains 21 chapters. Swedish-language chapter titles listed here are identical to those of the 21 chapters in the original volume one (1906).

Further Adventures of Nils

Howard's second volume contains 22 chapters numbered 1 to 22, where the original volume two (1907) contains 34 chapters numbered 22 to 55. Swedish-language chapter titles listed here are identical to those of 22 among the 34 original chapters. Chapter titles 6 to 18 match original chapter titles 36 to 48.

Howard cut some chapters entirely and abridged others. Some provinces are not featured in the Howard translation, including Dalarna, which is visited in four original chapters (29 to 32).

Print editions
 The Wonderful Adventures of Nils, Illustrated by Harold Heartt Foley. New York: Grosset & Dunlap, 1907.
 The Wonderful Adventures of Nils, translated by Velma Swanston Howard. Illustrated by Mary Hamilton Frye. Garden City, New York: Doubleday, Page & Company, 1913. 
 The Wonderful Adventures of Nils, Illustrated by H. Baumhauer. J.M. Dent and Sons, 1950.

Film adaptations

1955 Soviet animation

A Soviet traditionally animated feature film called The Enchanted Boy (Zakoldovannyy Malchik) was released in 1955.  It was directed by Vladimir Polkovnikov and Aleksandra Snezhko-Blotskaya and produced at the Soyuzmultfilm studio in Moscow.

1962 Swedish live action
Adventures of Nils Holgersson (Nils Holgerssons underbara resa) was released in 1962. It was shot primarily from helicopters, simplifying and downplaying the drama of the plot. It was directed by Kenne Fant.

1980 Japanese animation

An anime adaptation (ニルスのふしぎな旅 Nirusu no Fushigi na Tabi) consisting of fifty-two 25-minute episodes was broadcast on NHK from January 8, 1980—March 17, 1981. The anime was also broadcast:
 Albania
 in the Arab World (as "مغامرات نيلز" Nils' Adventures)
 Belgium 
 Canada (in French)
 (Mainland) China
 Czech Republic (as "Nils Holgersson")
 Finland (as "Peukaloisen retket", not dubbed in Finnish but simply narrated over the German dub, also released in DVD)
 France
 Germany
 Greece (as "Το θαυμαστό ταξίδι του Νίλς Χόλγκερσον" - "The wondrous journey of Nils Holgersson")
 Hong Kong (dubbed into Cantonese)
 Hungary (as "Nils Holgersson csodálatos utazása a vadludakkal" - "The Wonderful Journey of Nils Holgersson with the Wild Geese")
 Iceland (as "Nilli Hólmgeirsson")
 Iran
 Israel (as "נילס הולגרסון")
 Italy
 The Netherlands
 Poland (as "Nils and the wild geese")
 Portugal
 Romania
 Slovenia (as "Nils Holgerson" with one s)
 South Africa (Translated to Afrikaans as "Nils Holgerson")
 Spain
 Sweden
 Turkey (as "Uçan Kaz" ("The Flying Goose"))

In some countries it was cut to allow for commercials. The anime was the very first production by Studio Pierrot (Mamoru Oshii was a director on the series). The anime was mostly fairly true to the original, apart from the appearance of Nils' pet hamster, and the greater role allowed to the fox Smirre.

In Germany, the animated series episodes were also combined into one full feature animated movie (~ 1h 22min in length) in 1981; the same release has also been dubbed and released in Estonia on DVD & VHS and in Greece on DVD. In Germany, the anime was also adapted into a comic book series, with the drawings made by the Spanish Studio Interpubli, and the German Atelier Roche.

2011 Swedish/German two-parter

German TV broadcaster ARD premiered a live-action two-part adaptation starring Justus Kammerer as Nils and directed by Dirk Regel on Christmas 2011. Its total running time is 230 minutes. This version uses a mix of real animals, puppets, and CGI for the geese and other animals.

2017 French Studio 100 3D CGI Adaptation 
In 2017, a 3D CGI-based TV Series adaptation was released by French Studio 100 Animation. The release consists of 52 episodes, 13 minutes each.

Israeli version

In the 1960s the Israeli children's weekly "Etz'beoni" (אצבעוני) ran a long lasting Hebrew comic strip version, loosely based on the Swedish original, where the protagonist's name was changed to "Gil" (גיל) and the location was transferred to the Israeli countryside.

Swedish culture
The Wonderful Adventures of Nils is so well known in Swedish
culture that a picture of Nils Holgersson, on the back of a goose flying over the plains of Scania, was printed on the reverse side of the Swedish 20 krona banknote until new bills came in use in 2015.

Nils is also depicted in the logo of the digital map company Tele Atlas.

The sights Nils sees as he and his goose roam the provinces of Sweden are depicted in a series of Christmas plates produced by Rörstrand Pottery.  The series began in 1970 and continued until 1999. The plates illustrate the topography, architecture, industry, and wildlife of Sweden.

Influence on later fantasy

Lev Grossman's fantasy novel The Magicians includes numerous allusions to earlier works such as The Narnia Series and the Harry Potter books.  The influence of Nils Holgersson is evident in a key episode where a class of students nearing graduation from a School of Magic are set a major test: to be transformed into wild geese and undertake an epic flight, all the way from Upper New York State to Antarctica.

See also

Le Tour de la France par deux enfants
Le Monde 100 Books of the Century
 List of ornamental plates

Notes and references

External links

 
  (plain text and HTML) (Book 1&2)
Background to the commission to write The Wonderful Adventures of Nils, from The National Atlas of Sweden
The Wonderful Adventures of Nils, at Internet Archive (scanned books original editions color illustrated) (Book 1&2)

Nils Holgerssons underbara resa genom Sverige  available freely at Project Runeberg

1906 Swedish novels
1906 fantasy novels
Swedish children's novels
Swedish novels adapted into films
Fiction about size change
Novels by Selma Lagerlöf
Swedish-language novels
m
Novels set in Sweden
Children's novels about animals
1906 children's books
Swedish fantasy novels